The Perry Belmont House, sometimes referred to as the International Temple of the Order of the Eastern Star, though there are no ritual or ceremonial spaces in the building, is the world headquarters of the General Grand Chapter of the Order of the Eastern Star, one of several organizations affiliated with Freemasonry.  The building is located at 1618 New Hampshire Avenue, Northwest in the Dupont Circle neighborhood of Washington, D.C.
The International Temple was added to the National Register of Historic Places on May 8, 1973.

History
The building, Beaux-Arts in style, was built from 1907 to 1909 for Perry Belmont, son of August Belmont and grandson of Matthew C. Perry.  The trapezoidal plot of land was purchased for $90,000, and construction cost $1.5 million.  Perry Belmont served as a United States Congressman from New York, and later as the United States' ambassador to Spain.  French architect Ernest-Paul Sanson designed the building, having built several chateaux in Europe; the construction architect on site was Horace Trumbauer.

The house takes the form of a free-standing pavilion in the French style, with a single storey articulated with slender Ionic pilasters over a channel-rusticated basement.  A balustrade with stone urns masks a discreet Mansard attic storey. In the interiors Sanson used wrought-iron fixtures from France, wood from Germany, and marble from Italy.  During Belmont's lifetime, the house was used for only the winter months, when Belmont hosted lavish parties for Washington's elite.

In 1919, Edward, Prince of Wales,  was a guest of the Belmonts (at President Woodrow Wilson's request); there he handed out medals to various American soldiers whom Great Britain wished to honor for their roles in World War I.

The Belmonts continued to use the building until 1925.  Beginning in the 1920s, the Belmonts spent increasing amounts of time away from Washington, and the house was mothballed for almost a decade. Perry Belmont, a Freemason, sold the building to the General Grand Chapter of the Order of the Eastern Star in 1935 for $100,000, on the condition that the Right Worthy Grand Secretary would live in the building.

On May 8, 1973, the Belmont House was added to the National Register of Historic Places.  The building was designated a contributing property to the Dupont Circle Historic District in 1978.  The 2009 property value of the Belmont House was $7,475,100.

Current usage
The building serves as the headquarters for the General Grand Chapter of the Order of the Eastern Star.  The Right Worthy Grand Secretary and his/her spouse live on the premises.  Tours are arranged by appointment.  Items from the Belmont era of the mansion, as well as items sent to the headquarters as gifts from chapters around the world, are on display.  In the Venetian Dining Room, five ceiling paintings depict the five heroines of the Order.  There are 37 oil paintings and several Tiffany vases in the house.  The Japanese fourfold teakwood screen was a gift from the Emperor of Japan to Perry Belmont.

See also

 History of Washington, D.C.
 National Register of Historic Places listings in Washington, D.C.

References

External links

 The General Grand Chapter, Order of the Eastern Star

Houses completed in 1909
Beaux-Arts architecture in Washington, D.C.
Dupont Circle
Clubhouses on the National Register of Historic Places in Washington, D.C.
Houses on the National Register of Historic Places in Washington, D.C.
Order of the Eastern Star
Individually listed contributing properties to historic districts on the National Register in Washington, D.C.
Masonic buildings in Washington, D.C.
Horace Trumbauer buildings
Gilded Age mansions